Mülkülü (also, Mülkiilü and Myul’kyulyu) is a village and municipality in the Tovuz Rayon of Azerbaijan.  It has a population of 987.

References

See also
Aşağı Mülkülü, Lower Mülkülü

Populated places in Tovuz District